George Ebbert Seney (May 29, 1832 – June 11, 1905) was a nineteenth-century politician, lawyer and judge from Ohio. A Democrat, he served four terms in the United States House of Representatives from 1883 to 1891.

Biography
Born in Uniontown, Pennsylvania, he was grandson of Joshua Seney, and was also descended from colonial Governor of Maryland Francis Nicholson. Seney moved to Tiffin, Ohio with his parents in 1832. He attended Norwalk Seminary, studied law and was admitted to the bar in 1853, commencing practice in Tiffin. He declined appointment as United States Attorney for the Northern District of Ohio, tendered by President James Buchanan. He was a judge of the court of common pleas in 1857 and during the Civil War, enlisted in the 101st Ohio Infantry in 1862 where he was promoted to first lieutenant and later acted as quartermaster of the regiment until the close of the war.

Congress 
He lost election to the United States House of Representatives in 1874 by less than 140 votes. Seney was a delegate to the Democratic National Convention in 1876 and was elected a Democrat to the United States House of Representatives in 1882, serving from 1883 to 1891, not being a candidate for renomination in 1890. Afterwards, he resumed practicing law in Tiffin, Ohio until his death there on June 11, 1905. He was interred in Greenlawn Cemetery in Tiffin.

Seney was married to Anna Walker, granddaughter of founder of Tiffin, Josiah Hedges.
Judge Seney was a pallbearer for Chief Justice Morrison Waite.

See also

William B. Ebbert. (Congressman George Ebbert Seney was the cousin of John Van Kirk Ebbert, Sgt., 1st Regiment, W. Va. Infantry Volunteers, Union Army. Congressman George Ebbert Seney was the great uncle of William B. Ebbert, a Member of the Colorado General Assembly (1889-90 from 1907 to 1908, 1911–12))

References

External links
 Retrieved on 2008-10-13

1832 births
1905 deaths
Ohio lawyers
Ohio state court judges
Union Army officers
Quartermasters
People from Uniontown, Pennsylvania
People of Ohio in the American Civil War
People from Tiffin, Ohio
19th-century American politicians
19th-century American judges
Democratic Party members of the United States House of Representatives from Ohio
Military personnel from Pennsylvania